Francisco Godia Sales (21 March 1921 – 28 November 1990), better known as Paco Godia, was a racing driver from Barcelona, Spain. He was the first Spaniard ever to take part in a Formula One Grand Prix.

Complete Formula One World Championship results
(key)

Complete European Formula Two Championship results
(key)

References

Sources
 Formula One World Championship results are derived from 

Spanish racing drivers
Spanish Formula One drivers
Scuderia Milano Formula One drivers
Maserati Formula One drivers
Catalan racing drivers
Catalan Formula One drivers
European Formula Two Championship drivers
1921 births
1990 deaths
24 Hours of Le Mans drivers
World Sportscar Championship drivers